Big Sky Airlines was an American commuter air carrier that operated from 1978 to 2008. Headquartered in Billings, Montana, United States. Big Sky was wholly owned by Big Sky Transportation Company, which in turn was a wholly owned subsidiary of MAIR Holdings.

Big Sky operated scheduled commuter passenger services to ten cities and maintained a hub at Billings Logan International Airport in Billings, Montana, from which the airline flew more of its nonstop routes than it did from any other airport. The airline was a crucial air link within the state of Montana, serving as the primary (and in some cases, only) commercial air carrier to several small airports in the state. The airline also began and ended service to a number of other locations over the years, often operating as a contract carrier under the federal government's Essential Air Service (EAS) program.

History
The airline was established in 1978 and started operations on September 15, 1978, initially operating to a number of small cities in eastern and central Montana formerly served by the original Frontier Airlines. This remained the core of the company's business throughout its history, although the airline also expanded into a number of other geographic areas over the years. Most of the later expansions proved to be short-lived, however.

In 1987, Big Sky was operating code sharing service as Northwest Airlink on behalf of Northwest Airlines from a hub in Billings with British Aerospace BAe Jetstream 31 propjets.  The Jetstream turboprops were then replaced with Swearingen Metroliner propjets on the Northwest Airlink service.

Big Sky took over Exec Express II d/b/a Lone Star Airlines/Aspen Mountain Air's EAS routes in October 1998, following the bankruptcy of this Texas-based commuter air carrier. Transfer of services was completed in December 1998. These routes included: Dallas/Ft. Worth-Brownwood, TX; Dallas/Ft. Worth-Enid/Ponca City, OK; Dallas/Ft. Worth-Hot Springs-Harrison-Mountain Home, AR-St. Louis, MO; and Dallas/Ft. Worth-El Dorado-Jonesboro, AR.

On October 21, 2000, Big Sky began new service between Montana and north Texas via southeastern New Mexico with a Dallas/Ft. Worth-Hobbs-Carlsbad-Roswell-Denver-Billings route. This service was later modified to Dallas/Ft. Worth-Carlsbad-Roswell and Dallas/Ft. Worth-Brownwood-Hobbs routes. All New Mexico service ended in 2001.

In late 2002, Big Sky Airlines was operating nonstop flights between Idaho Falls, Idaho and Denver, Colorado but then cancelled this service three months afterward, declaring it unprofitable.

In early 2005, Big Sky announced several changes concerning its service including the termination of flights to North Dakota as well as the replacement of its Fairchild Metroliner propjets with Beechcraft 1900D turboprops with the latter being leased from Mesa Air Group subsidiary Air Midwest. Service from Sheridan, Wyoming to both Denver and Billings began by the end of 2005 but was then terminated in January 2008.

In February 2006 Big Sky began daily service between Walla Walla Regional Airport and Boise (BOI). Service ceased with the airline's bankruptcy in 2007.

In July 2006, Big Sky announced that the airline would discontinue service to Great Falls, Montana; Kalispell, Montana; and Spokane, Washington. The airline also announced that one of their Beechcraft 1900D's would be leased to Chalk's International Airlines in Florida.

On September 1, 2006, Big Sky discontinued service to Moses Lake, Washington.

On December 21, 2006, a press release announced that Big Sky would become a Delta Connection carrier via a code share agreement with Delta Air Lines using eight Beechcraft 1900D turboprops operated from Boston's Logan International Airport (BOS). The airline's east coast operations ended on January 7, 2008.

Closure
On December 20, 2007, Big Sky announced that it would more than likely cease operations within 60 to 90 days. This was due to the loss of the Delta contract, unusually bad weather, disappointing revenue and record-high fuel prices. The remaining Beechcraft 1900D aircraft were planned to be auctioned off and proceeds returned to MAIR holdings stockholders.

In late 2007 Great Lakes Airlines was given USDOT approval to take over EAS service to and from Billings, Montana and seven other Montana cities currently served by Big Sky. Great Lakes Airlines began flying the routes in 2009, only to be replaced with Gulfstream International Airlines (now named Silver Airways) by the Montana Essential Air Service Task Force in January 2011. The Montana routes were replaced once again by Cape Air on December 10, 2013.

Big Sky's final scheduled flights arrived in Billings on the morning of March 8, 2008; that morning, the three final flights marked the end of the airline by performing a joint flyover of the Billings airport prior to landing.

The airline's website, www.bigskyair.com, has been deactivated.

Destinations: Western and Central U.S.

Big Sky served the following destinations at different times during its existence.  Destination information is taken from various Big Sky Airlines route maps:

Arkansas
 El Dorado
 Harrison
 Hot Springs
 Jonesboro
 Mountain Home

Colorado
 Denver International Airport

Idaho
 Boise Airport
 Idaho Falls
 Lewiston
Minnesota
 Minneapolis/St. Paul International Airport

Missouri
 St. Louis Lambert International Airport

Montana
 Billings Logan International Airport – Hub
 Bozeman Yellowstone International Airport
 Butte (Bert Mooney Airport)
 Glasgow Airport
 Glendive (Dawson Community Airport)
 Great Falls International Airport
 Havre City–County Airport
 Helena Regional Airport
 Kalispell (Glacier Park International Airport)
 Lewistown Municipal Airport
 Miles City Airport
 Missoula International Airport
 Sidney (Richland Municipal Airport)
 Wolf Point (L. M. Clayton Airport)

New Mexico
 Carlsbad
 Hobbs
 Roswell International Air Center

North Dakota

 Bismarck
 Devils Lake
 Dickinson
 Grand Forks
 Jamestown
 Williston

Oklahoma
 Enid
 Ponca City

Oregon
 Portland International Airport

South Dakota

Rapid City

Texas
 Brownwood
 Dallas/Fort Worth International Airport – Hub

Washington
 Moses Lake (Grant County International Airport)
 Seattle/Tacoma International Airport
 Spokane International Airport
 Walla Walla
 Olympia Regional Airport

Wyoming
 Casper
 Gillette
 Sheridan County Airport

Delta Connection Routes:  Eastern U.S. and Canada

Maine
 Bangor, Maine

Massachusetts
 Boston, Massachusetts – Hub

New Brunswick
 Fredericton, New Brunswick, Canada

New Jersey
 Trenton, New Jersey

New York
 Albany, New York
 Long Island/Islip, New York
 Massena, New York
 Ogdensburg, New York
 Plattsburgh, New York
 Saranac Lake, New York
 Watertown, New York

Ohio
 Cincinnati, Ohio – Hub

Pennsylvania
 Allentown/Bethlehem/Easton, Pennsylvania

Quebec
 Quebec, Quebec, Canada

Vermont
 Burlington, Vermont

Fleet
In January 2000, the Big Sky Airlines fleet consisted of 14 Fairchild Swearingen Metroliner Metro III and Metro 23 aircraft.

However, the air carrier then removed the Metro propjets from its fleet and in January 2008 was operating Beechcraft 1900D turboprops with 10 aircraft in the fleet:

Big Sky previously operated Handley Page Jetstream propjets as well as Cessna prop aircraft during the late 1970s.  By 1987, the airline was operating British Aerospace BAe Jetstream 31 propjets on its flights as a Northwest Airlink air carrier.

Code share agreements
Big Sky had code share agreements with the following airlines. The code share agreements allowed these larger mainline air carriers to place their airline codes on Big Sky flights, but not vice versa.
 Alaska Airlines
 Delta Air Lines (as Delta Connection)
 Northwest Airlines (as Northwest Airlink)
 US Airways

References

External links
 Big Sky Airlines (Archive)

Airlines established in 1978
Airlines disestablished in 2008
Billings, Montana
Defunct regional airlines of the United States
Defunct companies based in Montana
Regional Airline Association members
1978 establishments in Montana
2008 disestablishments in Montana
Defunct airlines of the United States
Airlines based in Montana